Timothy Randall Martin (born 28 April 1955) is an English businessman and the founder and chairman of Wetherspoons, a pub chain in the UK and Ireland. In 2016, Martin actively campaigned for the United Kingdom to leave the European Union and was a strong supporter of Brexit, donating £200,000 to the Vote Leave campaign.

Early life
Timothy Martin was born on 28 April 1955 in Norwich. His father served in the Royal Air Force and then worked for brewing multinational Guinness plc, where he became Malaysian marketing director. He has a brother, Trevor.  Martin was educated at eleven schools in New Zealand and Northern Ireland, including Campbell College, Belfast, and the Royal Belfast Academical Institution.

He earned a bachelor's degree in law from the University of Nottingham, and qualified as a barrister in 1979, but has never practised.

Career

His early jobs included working on a building site in Ware, and acting as a sales representative for The Times.

Martin is the founder and chairman of Wetherspoon. He bought his first pub, in Muswell Hill, in 1979 which was originally named Martin’s Free House before renaming to Wetherspoons, named after one of Martin's teachers who stated he would never be a success. His brother Gerry also ran a pub chain, Old Monk, which was listed in 1998, but went out of business in 2002.

After the initial opening of Martins first location, the organisation kept growing and expanding as Wetherspoons started opening more locations throughout the north of London, and eventually across the whole UK. In 1992 Wetherspoons was listed on the Stock Exchange as JD Wetherspoon plc.

In 1998, Martin kept expanding the companies operations and opened 20 locations in one month in July, with seven opening on the same day.

In 2000, under Martins leadership, Wetherspoons opened its 400th location and by 2008 the number had increased to 800 Wetherspoons locations.

In 2005, Martin was voted the fifth most influential person in the UK pub industry. He is an admirer of Sam Walton's business philosophy. He visits at least 15 Wetherspoons outlets each week.

As of February 2023, Martin owned 30.77m shares (23.90% of shares).

In January 2022, the Wetherspoons pub chain closed 10 pubs across the UK with 35 more up for sale, Martin stated that pubs across the UK are being crippled via unfair taxes in comparison to supermarkets. Martin went on to state that he is pushing for tax parity with supermarkets and unless this is implemented the pub industry would inevitably shrink.

Political views

Brexit
Martin was a staunch supporter of Brexit in 2016, representing these views for journalists and on political TV programmes such as the BBC's Politics Live, and Sky News, and BBC Radio 4 programmes including Today, Question Time and Farming Today. In 2016, Martin donated £200,000 to the Vote Leave campaign. Throughout the campaign, he gave his reasons for the United Kingdom's withdrawal from the European Union.

In January 2017, Wetherspoons published figures showing an increase in sales of more than 3%. Martin used this as evidence that there was no post-Brexit referendum slowdown as predicted by economists.

In June 2018, Martin announced that Wetherspoons would be ceasing the sale of products from other European Union countries in a 24-month plan, with the immediate example of Prosecco and Champagne being replaced by Australian wines. He believes the prediction of food prices rising and food shortages leading to stockpiling of supplies in the UK post-Brexit is merely scaremongering tactics deployed by pro-EU journalists, and mentioned the fact there were no increased queues in his restaurants as a result; after he removed French brandy from sale in his restaurants as an example.

Wetherspoons mass posted a pro-Brexit magazine to an unknown number of households in January 2019. The magazine claims to have a readership of two million. The employee campaign group, Spoons Workers Against Brexit, described the publication as dangerous propaganda, and said that Martin was exploiting his position as CEO. Wetherspoon responded by defending the mass mailing, stating it contained "... pro and anti Brexit articles to stimulate debate"; the proportionately minor mentions of views critical to a no deal Brexit were preceded by statements by Tim Martin, deriding expert opinions and "the elite".

In June 2021, Martin called on the UK government to introduce a "reasonably liberal immigration system" controlled by Britain rather than the European Union. He suggested the government should adopt a visa scheme for workers from the EU to help the UK's pubs and restaurants hire more staff.

COVID-19 pandemic
Martin criticised the shutdown of businesses during the COVID-19 pandemic, saying that it was "over the top" and that pubs should continue to operate but with social distancing measures in place. After criticism regarding the shutdown of all pubs due to the spread of COVID-19, Martin addressed his 40,000 employees by video message. He acknowledged the government would pay 80 per cent of the wages of staff at companies who have lost work during the crisis, but he said the money could take weeks to come through. Martin suggested that if some staff were offered jobs in supermarkets they should consider taking them and promised that he would give first preference to those who wanted to come back to Wetherspoons.

On 19 January 2022, in a statement to the London Stock Exchange, Martin accused the Prime Minister Boris Johnson of "hypocrisy" over the "Partygate" scandal, arguing that much of the controversy would have been avoided if Downing Street staff had been able to visit pubs which, at the time of the alleged lockdown parties, were closed due to coronavirus restrictions.

Personal life
Martin is married to Felicity, whom he met while at university; they have four children and live in Exeter, Devon.

References

1955 births
Living people
Alumni of the University of Nottingham
British company founders
British Eurosceptics
British hospitality businesspeople
Businesspeople from Norwich
People educated at Campbell College